The human KDM2B gene encodes the protein lysine (K)-specific demethylase 2B.

Tissue and subcellular distribution 

KDM2B is broadly and highly expressed in embryonic tissues (especially in the developing central nervous system of vertebrates). Expression of KDM2B is also retained in most organs in adults. The protein is present in the nucleoplasm and is enriched in the nucleolus where it binds the transcribed region of ribosomal RNA to represses the transcription of ribosomal RNA genes which inhibits cell growth and proliferation.

Structure 

KDM2B protein has several domains including a JmjC domain that has a histone demethylase activity demethylating trimethylated Lys-4 and dimethylated Lys-36 of histone H3. KDM2B specifically recognizes and bind non-methylated DNA in CpG islands through its ZF-CxxC DNA binding domain.  KDM2B consequently recruits the non-canonical polycomb repressive complex 1.1 (ncPRC1) to unmethylated CpG islands via a direct interaction with BCOR and PCGF1 leading to the mono-ubiquitylation of histone H2A on K119 and gene repression.

Function 

This gene encodes a member of the F-box protein family which is characterized by an approximately 40 amino acid motif, the F-box. The F-box proteins constitute one of the four subunits of ubiquitin protein ligase complex called SCFs (SKP1-cullin-F-box), which function in phosphorylation-dependent ubiquitination. The F-box proteins are divided into 3 classes: Fbws containing WD-40 domains, Fbls containing leucine-rich repeats, and Fbxs containing either different protein-protein interaction modules or no recognizable motifs. The protein encoded by this gene belongs to the Fbls class. Multiple alternatively spliced transcript variants have been found for this gene, but the full-length nature of some variants has not been determined.

As part of the ncPRC1.1 complex, KDM2B was found to be rapidly and transiently recruited to sites of DNA damage in a PARP1- and TIMELESS-dependent manner to promote mono-ubiquitylation of histone H2A on K119 with concomitant local decrease of H2A levels and an increase of H2A.Z.  These events promote transcriptional repression at DNA lesions, double strand break signaling, and homologous recombination repair. The activity of the ncPRC1.1 complex at DNA lesions was necessary for the proper recruitment of the two canonical PRC1 complexes (cPRC1.2 and cPRC1.4), defined by their PCGF subunits, MEL18 and BMI1 respectively. Therefore, recruitment of the ncPRC1.1 complex represents an early and critical regulatory step in homologous recombination repair.

Clinical significance 

Loss of KDM2B leads to severe developmental defects (growth defects in the brain, including failure of neural tube closure and craniofacial malformations, hematopoietic development) leading to embryonic lethality

References

Further reading

External links 
 

Genes on human chromosome 12